Comic characters named Wraith include:
Wraith (Hector Rendoza), a one-time member of the X-Men
Wraith (Brian DeWolff), a supervillain adversary of Spider-Man
Wraith (Zak-Del), a character introduced in the Marvel Comics storyline Annihilation Conquest
Wraith (Yuri Watanabe), a rival and former ally of Spider-Man. 
John Wraith, an X-Men supporting character who goes by the alias of Kestrel
Wraith (Amalgam Comics) (Todd LeBeau), an Amalgam Comics character from JLX
Wraith (Image Comics), a member of Dynamo 5, formerly known as Myriad.
Wraith (independent comics), a funny-animal detective created by Michael T. Gilbert in Quack!, a title of Star Reach Comics

See also
Wraith (disambiguation)